The following article presents a summary of the 1911 football (soccer) season in Brazil, which was the 10th season of competitive football in the country.

Campeonato Paulista

Final Standings

São Paulo Athletic declared as the Campeonato Paulista champions.

State championship champions

Interstate championship champions

In 1911, the first interstate competition was held, between the 1910 São Paulo and Rio de Janeiro state champions:

References

 Brazilian competitions at RSSSF

 
Seasons in Brazilian football
Brazil